The Amazing Adventures of Mr. F. Lea, often shortened to Mr. F. Lea, is an arcade game released by Pacific Novelty in 1982. It is a collection of four canine-themed mini-games that borrow gameplay elements from Donkey Kong, Frogger, and Jungle Hunt, and a fourth game where Mr. F. Lea runs up a dog's back, jumping over spots and bursting balloons.

References

External links

1982 video games
Arcade video games
Arcade-only video games
Video game clones
Video games developed in the United States